John T. Traynor (November 19, 1926 – July 11, 2021) was an American politician who was a member of the North Dakota State Senate. He represented the 15th district from 1991 to 2006 as a member of the Republican party. An attorney, he received his law degree at the University of North Dakota in 1951.

He died on July 11, 2021, in Devils Lake, North Dakota, at age 94.

References

1926 births
2021 deaths
Republican Party North Dakota state senators
University of North Dakota alumni
People from Devils Lake, North Dakota